The 2018 South Africa Sevens was the second tournament within the 2018–19 World Rugby Sevens Series and the twentieth edition of the South Africa Sevens. It was held on 8–9 December 2018 at Cape Town Stadium in Cape Town, South Africa.

Format
The teams were drawn into four pools of four teams each. Each team played every other team in their pool once. The top two teams from each pool advanced to the Cup brackets where teams competed for the Gold, Silver, and Bronze medals. The bottom two teams from each group went to the playoffs in the Challenge Trophy brackets.

Teams
Fifteen core teams are participating in the tournament along with one invited team, 2018 Africa Men's Sevens winners Zimbabwe:

Pool stage
All times in South African Standard Time (UTC+2:00)

Pool A

Pool B

Pool C

Pool D

Knockout stage

Thirteenth place

Challenge Trophy

Fifth place

Cup

Tournament placings

Source: World Rugby

Players

Scoring leaders

Source: World Rugby

Dream Team 

The following seven players were selected to the tournament Dream Team at the conclusion of the tournament:

See also
 World Rugby Sevens Series
 2018–19 World Rugby Sevens Series
 World Rugby

References

External links 
 Tournament site
 World Rugby info

2018
2018–19 World Rugby Sevens Series
2018 in South African rugby union
December 2018 sports events in Africa